Shirley Mary Annan (née Patrick, 30 September 1940 – 27 March 2017) was a New Zealand netball player. A goal keeper and goal defence, Annan was noted for her tight marking. She represented both Otago and Canterbury at a provincial level, and played three games for the New Zealand national netball team in 1960. Her granddaughter, Abby Erwood, also a netball player, made her debut for the Southern Steel in 2015.

Annan died on 27 March 2017, and was buried at Alexandra Cemetery.

References

1940 births
2017 deaths
New Zealand netball players
New Zealand international netball players